is a Japanese fashion model and tarento. She is represented with Platinum Production. She works mainly on modeling of the magazine JJ.

Works

Singles

Videos
 2006

 2008

 2009
{|class="wikitable"
|-
! Title
|-
| Mucha-buri! 3rd.Season Vol.3 Kanzenhan
|-
| Butai "Ojigi de Shape Up!'''
|-
| Wednesday –Another World– Twilight File VI|}

Filmography
Television (terrestrial)
 Regular appearances

 Guest appearances

Television (CS)

Radio

Internet

Stage

Films

Advertisements

Music videos

CD Jackets

See alsoCawaii!''
JJ (magazine)
Yoshio Kojima
Sanrio – Sanrio Puroland

References

External links
 
 
 

Japanese female models
Japanese television personalities
Models from Chiba Prefecture
1984 births
Living people